is a Japanese syllabary, part of the Japanese writing system, along with katakana as well as kanji.

It is a phonetic lettering system. The word hiragana literally means "flowing" or "simple" kana ("simple" originally as contrasted with kanji).

Hiragana and katakana are both kana systems. With few exceptions, each mora in the Japanese language is represented by one character (or one digraph) in each system. This may be either a vowel such as "a" (hiragana あ); a consonant followed by a vowel such as "ka" (か); or "n" (ん), a nasal sonorant which, depending on the context, sounds either like English m, n or ng when syllable-final or like the nasal vowels of French, Portuguese or Polish. Because the characters of the kana do not represent single consonants (except in the case of ん "n"), the kana are referred to as syllabic symbols and not alphabetic letters.

Hiragana is used to write okurigana (kana suffixes following a kanji root, for example to inflect verbs and adjectives), various grammatical and function words including particles, as well as miscellaneous other native words for which there are no kanji or whose kanji form is obscure or too formal for the writing purpose. Words that do have common kanji renditions may also sometimes be written instead in hiragana, according to an individual author's preference, for example to impart an informal feel. Hiragana is also used to write furigana, a reading aid that shows the pronunciation of kanji characters.

There are two main systems of ordering hiragana: the old-fashioned iroha ordering and the more prevalent gojūon ordering.

Writing system

After the 1900 script reform, which deemed hundreds of characters hentaigana, the hiragana syllabary consists of 48 base characters, of which two (ゐ and ゑ) are only used in some proper names:

 42 consonant–vowel unions
 へ is pronounced  when used as a particle.
 を is only used as a particle and in some names. It is often pronounced  instead.
 ゐ and ゑ are both obsolete, only used in some names. They are usually respectively pronounced  and  instead.
 1 singular consonant (ん)

These are conceived as a 5×10 grid (gojūon, "Fifty Sounds"), as illustrated in the adjacent table, read           and so forth (but si→shi, ti→chi, tu→tsu, hu→fu), with the singular consonant  appended to the end. Of the 50 theoretically possible combinations, yi, ye, and wu are obsolete, while wi (ゐ), and we (ゑ), are now uncommon in modern Japanese. Wo (を), pronounced , is common as a particle but otherwise rare.

These basic characters can be modified in various ways. By adding a dakuten marker ( ゛), a voiceless consonant is turned into a voiced consonant: k→g, ts/s→z, t→d, h→b and ch/sh→j (also u→v(u)). For example, か (ka) becomes が (ga). Hiragana beginning with an h (or f) sound can also add a handakuten marker ( ゜) changing the h (f) to a p. For example, は (ha) becomes ぱ (pa).

A small version of the hiragana for ya, yu, or yo (ゃ, ゅ or ょ respectively) may be added to hiragana ending in i. This changes the i vowel sound to a glide (palatalization) to a, u or o. For example, き (ki) plus ゃ (small ya) becomes  (kya). Addition of the small y kana is called yōon.

A small tsu っ, called a sokuon, indicates that the following consonant is geminated (doubled). However, it cannot be used to double an n – for this purpose, the singular n (ん) is added in front of the syllable, as in みんな (minna, "all").

Hiragana usually spells long vowels with the addition of a second vowel kana; for example, おかあさん (o-ka-a-sa-n, "mother"). The chōonpu (long vowel mark) (ー) used in katakana is rarely used with hiragana, for example in the word , rāmen, but this usage is considered non-standard in Japanese. However, the Okinawan language uses chōonpu with hiragana. In informal writing, small versions of the five vowel kana are sometimes used to represent trailing off sounds (haa, nee). Standard and voiced iteration marks are written in hiragana as ゝ and ゞ respectively.

Table of hiragana
The following table shows the complete hiragana together with the modified Hepburn romanization and IPA transcription in the gojūon order. Hiragana with dakuten or handakuten follow the gojūon kana without them, with the yōon kana following. Those in bold do not use the initial sound for that row. For all syllables besides ん, the pronunciation indicated is for word-initial syllables, for mid-word pronunciations see below.

Spelling–phonology correspondence 
In the middle of words, the g sound (normally ) may turn into a velar nasal  or velar fricative . An exception to this is numerals; 15 jūgo is considered to be one word, but is pronounced as if it was jū and go stacked end to end: .

For example,  sūji  'number',  zasshi  'magazine'.

In archaic forms of Japanese, there existed the kwa and gwa digraphs. In modern Japanese, these phonemes have been phased out of usage and only exist in the extended katakana digraphs for approximating foreign language words, names and loanwords.

The singular n is pronounced  before t, ch, ts, n, r, z, j and d,  before m, b and p,  before k and g,  at the end of utterances, and some kind of high nasal vowel  before vowels, palatal approximants (y), and fricative consonants (s, sh, h, f and w).

For example,  (lit. toukyou) is pronounced  'Tokyo', and  sensei is  'teacher'. However,  tou is pronounced  'to inquire', because the o and u are considered distinct, u being the verb ending in the dictionary form. Similarly,  shite iru is pronounced  'is doing'.

For a more thorough discussion on the sounds of Japanese, please refer to Japanese phonology.

Obsolete kana

Hentaigana

Polysyllabic kana

yi, ye and wu

yi 

Though ye did appear in some textbooks during the Meiji period along with another kana for yi in the form of cursive 以. Today it is considered a Hentaigana by scholars and is encoded in Unicode 10  This kana could have a colloquial use, to convert the combo yui (ゆい) into yii (い), due to other Japanese words having a similar change.

ye 

An early, now obsolete, hiragana-esque form of ye may have existed (𛀁 ) in pre-Classical Japanese (prior to the advent of kana), but is generally represented for purposes of reconstruction by the kanji 江, and its hiragana form is not present in any known orthography. In modern orthography, ye can also be written as いぇ (イェ in katakana).

It is true that in early periods of kana, hiragana and katakana letters for "ye" were used, but soon after the distinction between /ye/ and /e/ went away, and letters and glyphs were not established.

wu 

Hiragana  also appeared in different Meiji-era textbooks. However, it was never commonly used. This character is included in Unicode 14 as HIRAGANA LETTER ARCHAIC WU (𛄟).

Spelling rules

This has not always been the case: a previous system of spelling, now referred to as historical kana usage, differed substantially from pronunciation; the three above-mentioned exceptions in modern usage are the legacy of that system.

There are two hiragana pronounced ji (じ and ぢ) and two hiragana pronounced zu (ず and づ), but to distinguish them, particularly when typing Japanese, sometimes ぢ is written as di and づ is written as du. These pairs are not interchangeable. Usually, ji is written as じ and zu is written as ず. There are some exceptions. If the first two syllables of a word consist of one syllable without a dakuten and the same syllable with a dakuten, the same hiragana is used to write the sounds. For compound words where the dakuten reflects rendaku voicing, the original hiragana is used. For example, chi ( 'blood') is spelled ち in plain hiragana. When  hana ('nose') and  chi ('blood') combine to make hanaji ( 'nose bleed'), the sound of  changes from chi to ji. So hanaji is spelled  according to ち: the basic hiragana used to transcribe . Similarly, tsukau ('to use') is spelled  in hiragana, so kanazukai ('kana use', or 'kana orthography') is spelled  in hiragana.

However, this does not apply when kanji are used phonetically to write words that do not relate directly to the meaning of the kanji (see also ateji). The Japanese word for 'lightning', for example, is inazuma. The  component means 'rice plant', is written  in hiragana and is pronounced: ina. The  component means 'wife' and is pronounced tsuma (つま) when written in isolation—or frequently as zuma  when it features after another syllable. Neither of these components have anything to do with 'lightning', but together they do when they compose the word for 'lightning'.

Officially, ぢ and づ do not occur word-initially pursuant to modern spelling rules. There were words such as  jiban 'ground' in the historical kana usage, but they were unified under じ in the modern kana usage in 1946, so today it is spelled exclusively . However,  zura 'wig' (from  katsura) and  zuke (a sushi term for lean tuna soaked in soy sauce) are examples of word-initial づ today. Some people write the word for hemorrhoids as ぢ (normally じ) for emphasis.

No standard Japanese words begin with the kana ん (n). This is the basis of the word game shiritori. ん n is normally treated as its own syllable and is separate from the other n-based kana (na, ni etc.).

ん is sometimes directly followed by a vowel (a, i, u, e or o) or a palatal approximant (ya, yu or yo). These are clearly distinct from the na, ni etc. syllables, and there are minimal pairs such as  kin'en 'smoking forbidden',  kinen 'commemoration',  kinnen 'recent years'. In Hepburn romanization, they are distinguished with an apostrophe, but not all romanization methods make the distinction. For example, past prime minister Junichiro Koizumi's first name is actually  Jun'ichirō pronounced 

There are a few hiragana that are rarely used. Outside of Okinawan orthography, ゐ wi  and ゑ we  are only used in some proper names. 𛀁 e was an alternate version of え e before spelling reform, and was briefly reused for ye during initial spelling reforms, but is now completely obsolete. ゔ vu is a modern addition used to represent the /v/ sound in foreign languages such as English, but since Japanese from a phonological standpoint does not have a /v/ sound, it is pronounced as /b/ and mostly serves as a more accurate indicator of a word's pronunciation in its original language. However, it is rarely seen because loanwords and transliterated words are usually written in katakana, where the corresponding character would be written as ヴ. For example,  'throughout Japan' could be written , but is practically always 

The  myu kana is extremely rare in originally Japanese words; linguist Haruhiko Kindaichi raises the example of the Japanese family name Omamyūda  and claims it is the only occurrence amongst pure Japanese words. Its katakana counterpart is used in many loanwords, however.

History

Hiragana developed from man'yōgana, Chinese characters used for their pronunciations, a practice that started in the 5th century. The oldest examples of Man'yōgana include the Inariyama Sword, an iron sword excavated at the Inariyama Kofun. This sword is thought to be made in the year  (most commonly taken to be C.E. 471).
The forms of the hiragana originate from the cursive script style of Chinese calligraphy. The table to the right shows the derivation of hiragana from manyōgana via cursive script. The upper part shows the character in the regular script form, the center character in red shows the cursive script form of the character, and the bottom shows the equivalent hiragana. The cursive script forms are not strictly confined to those in the illustration.

When it was first developed, hiragana was not accepted by everyone. The educated or elites preferred to use only the kanji system. Historically, in Japan, the regular script (kaisho) form of the characters was used by men and called , "men's writing", while the cursive script (sōsho) form of the kanji was used by women. Hence hiragana first gained popularity among women, who were generally not allowed access to the same levels of education as men, thus hiragana was first widely used among court women in the writing of personal communications and literature. From this comes the alternative name of  "women's writing". For example, The Tale of Genji and other early novels by female authors used hiragana extensively or exclusively. Even today, hiragana is felt to have a feminine quality.

Male authors came to write literature using hiragana. Hiragana was used for unofficial writing such as personal letters, while katakana and Chinese were used for official documents. In modern times, the usage of hiragana has become mixed with katakana writing. Katakana is now relegated to special uses such as recently borrowed words (i.e., since the 19th century), names in transliteration, the names of animals, in telegrams, and for emphasis.

Originally, for all syllables there was more than one possible hiragana. In 1900, the system was simplified so each syllable had only one hiragana.

The pangram poem Iroha-uta ("ABC song/poem"), which dates to the 10th century, uses every hiragana once (except n ん, which was just a variant of む before the Muromachi era).

Stroke order and direction 
The following table shows the method for writing each hiragana character. The table is arranged in a traditional manner, beginning top right and reading columns down. The numbers and arrows indicate the stroke order and direction respectively.

Unicode 

Hiragana was added to the Unicode Standard in October, 1991 with the release of version 1.0.

The Unicode block for Hiragana is U+3040–U+309F:

The Unicode hiragana block contains precomposed characters for all hiragana in the modern set, including small vowels and yōon kana for compound syllables as well as the rare ゐ wi and ゑ we; the archaic 𛀁 ye is included in plane 1 at U+1B001 (see below). All combinations of hiragana with dakuten and handakuten used in modern Japanese are available as precomposed characters (including the rare ゔ vu), and can also be produced by using a base hiragana followed by the combining dakuten and handakuten characters (U+3099 and U+309A, respectively). This method is used to add the diacritics to kana that are not normally used with them, for example applying the dakuten to a pure vowel or the handakuten to a kana not in the h-group.

Characters U+3095 and U+3096 are small か (ka) and small け (ke), respectively. U+309F is a ligature of より (yori) occasionally used in vertical text. U+309B and U+309C are spacing (non-combining) equivalents to the combining dakuten and handakuten characters, respectively.

Historic and variant forms of Japanese kana characters were first added to the Unicode Standard in October, 2010 with the release of version 6.0, with significantly more added in 2017 as part of Unicode 10.

The Unicode block for Kana Supplement is U+1B000–U+1B0FF, and is immediately followed by the Kana Extended-A block (U+1B100–U+1B12F). These blocks include mainly hentaigana (historic or variant hiragana):

The Unicode block for Kana Extended-B is U+1AFF0–U+1AFFF:

The Unicode block for Small Kana Extension is U+1B130–U+1B16F:

In the following character sequences a kana from the /k/ row is modified by a handakuten combining mark to indicate that a syllable starts with an initial nasal, known as bidakuon. As of Unicode 15.0, these character combinations are explicitly called out as Named Sequences:

See also
Japanese writing system
Bopomofo (Zhùyīn fúhào, "phonetic symbols"), a phonetic system of 37 characters for writing Chinese developed in the 1900s and is more common in Taiwan.
Iteration mark explains the iteration marks used with hiragana.
Japanese phonology explains Japanese pronunciation in detail.
Japanese typographic symbols gives other non-kana, non-kanji symbols.
Katakana
Nüshu, a syllabary writing system used by women in China's Hunan province
Shodō, Japanese calligraphy.

Notes

References

Citations

Sources 

 Yujiro Nakata, The Art of Japanese Calligraphy, gives details of the development of onode and onnade.

External links 

 Hiragana unicode chart
 Hiragana table with strokes animations

Japanese writing system terms
Kana
Japanese writing system
Syllabary writing systems

sv:Kana (skriftsystem)#Hiragana